Octomyomermis is a genus of nematodes belonging to the family Mermithidae.

Species:
 Octomyomermis albicans Camino, 1985 
 Octomyomermis arecoensis Camino, 1991

References

Mermithidae